Movement for a Responsible, Sustainable and Entrepreneurial Venezuela (MOVERSE) is a green political party in Venezuela.

History
The Ecological Movement of Venezuela is historically, the second Venezuelan political green party. The party grew to become a recognized political entity by the National Electoral Council in February 2012. They define themselves a center-left environmentalist political movement aiming to promote a new National Political Project holding democracy, sustainable economy and inclusive communities as the foundations of the new free, innovative, responsible and progressive new plural citizenship.

See also
List of political parties in Venezuela

References

External links
https://web.archive.org/web/20120914061616/http://moverse.net/ 

2012 establishments in Venezuela
Environment of Venezuela
Green parties in South America
Political parties established in 2012
Political parties in Venezuela